Park Yoon-Ki (Hangul: 박윤기, in Taebaek, South Korea) is a former South Korean footballer.

He participated in the AFC Youth Championship in 1978, where South Korea U-20 team was the joint winner with the Iraq U-20 team. In the following year, he was a member of the South Korea U-20 team that competed in the 1979 FIFA World Youth Championship in Japan.

He played as a founding member of K-League side Yukong Elephants, and he played Lucky-Goldstar Hwangso in South Korea and one year at Japan regional leagues side Matzda FC.

He was a founding member of K-League, and he scored the league's first goal on May 8, 1983 against Hallelujah FC. In his first season, he was the best scorer by scoring 9 goals.

At the end of the 1986 season, he moved to Lucky-Goldstar Hwangso. At Lucky-Goldstar, he scored his last K-League goal and K-League's 1,000th goal. The following season he went to Matzda FC in Japan's regional league with Kang Shin-woo. One year later, he retired from professional football.

After retirement, he started his coaching career.

Club career 
1979-1982 Seoul City FC - amateur
1983-1986 Yukong Elephants
1987 Lucky-Goldstar Hwangso
1988 Matzda FC

References
 Legends of K-League : 박윤기 - K리그 1호골의 주인공

External links
 
 

1960 births
Living people
Association football forwards
South Korean footballers
South Korean expatriate footballers
Jeju United FC players
FC Seoul players
K League 1 players
Sanfrecce Hiroshima players
Japan Soccer League players
Expatriate footballers in Japan
South Korean expatriate sportspeople in Japan
People from Taebaek
Sportspeople from Gangwon Province, South Korea